Marc Lemay (born April 4, 1951) is a Canadian politician who served as the Member of Parliament (MP) for Abitibi—Témiscamingue from 2004 to 2011. He is a member of the Bloc Québécois (BQ).

Biography

Lemay was born in Amos, Quebec. A lawyer by occupation, he was first elected to the House of Commons in the 2004 federal election as the Bloc Québécois candidate in the newly-established riding of Abitibi—Témiscamingue. He defeated sitting MP Gilbert Barrette, the Liberal candidate, by nearly 12,000 votes. As a parliamentarian, Lemay was the Bloc's critic for Indian Affairs and Northern Development. He was defeated in the 2011 federal election by Christine Moore of the New Democratic Party (NDP).

External links 
 
 

1951 births
Bloc Québécois MPs
French Quebecers
Living people
Members of the House of Commons of Canada from Quebec
People from Amos, Quebec
People from Rouyn-Noranda
21st-century Canadian politicians